The 1909–10 İstanbul Football League season was the 6th season of the league. Galatasaray won the league for the second time.

Season

Matches
Galatasaray - Strugglers FC: 5-1
Galatasaray - Strugglers FC: 4-1
Galatasaray - Fenerbahçe SK: 3-0
Galatasaray - Moda FC: 2-0
Galatasaray - Moda FC: 8-0
Galatasaray - Cadi-Keuy FC: 1-0
Galatasaray - Elpis FC: 1-0
Fenerbahçe SK - Strugglers FC: 0-3

References
http://www.mackolik.com/Standings/Default.aspx?sId=15832
 Tuncay, Bülent (2002). Galatasaray Tarihi. Yapı Kredi Yayınları 

Istanbul Football League seasons
Istanbul
Istanbul